is a Japanese voice actor currently associated with the Clutch voice actor agency. Maezuka is noted for his roles as Ralf Jones, Benimaru Nikaido, and Choi Bounge in The King of Fighters fighting game series. He has also voiced the latter two in Capcom vs. SNK, and the first in The King of Fighters: Another Day anime; in addition to that, he has had voiceover experience playing Sling and the narrator in the original Japanese version of Beast Wars Neo. Maezuka is also noted for having done the voices of Kyoshiro Senryo and Nicotine Caffeine in the Samurai Shodown series, as well as Ken Masters in SNK vs. Capcom: SVC Chaos.

Filmography

Animation 
The King of Fighters: Another Day (2006) – Ralf Jones
The King of Fighters: Destiny (2017–2018) – Benimaru Nikaido, Choi Bounge

Video games 
The King of Fighters '94 (1994) – Benimaru Nikaido, Choi Bounge, Ralf Jones
Samurai Shodown II (1994) – Kyoshiro Senryo, Nicotine Caffeine
The King of Fighters '95 (1995) – Benimaru Nikaido, Choi Bounge, Ralf Jones
Samurai Shodown III (1995) – Kyoshiro Senryo
Art of Fighting 3: The Path of the Warrior (1996) – Wang Koh-San, Wyler
The King of Fighters '96 (1996) – Benimaru Nikaido, Choi Bounge, Ralf Jones
Samurai Shodown IV (1996) – Kyoshiro Senryo
The King of Fighters '97 (1997) – Benimaru Nikaido, Choi Bounge, Ralf Jones
The Last Blade (1997) – Shikyoh
The King of Fighters '98 (1998) – Benimaru Nikaido, Choi Bounge, Ralf Jones
The Last Blade 2 (1998) – Mukuro
The King of Fighters '99 (1999) – Benimaru Nikaido, Choi Bounge, Ralf Jones
The King of Fighters 2000 (2000) – Benimaru Nikaido, Choi Bounge, Ralf Jones
Capcom vs. SNK: Millennium Fight 2000 (2000) – Benimaru Nikaido
Capcom vs. SNK 2: Millionaire Fighting 2001 (2001) – Benimaru Nikaido, Choi Bounge
The King of Fighters 2001 (2001) – Benimaru Nikaido, Choi Bounge, Ralf Jones
The King of Fighters 2002 (2002) – Benimaru Nikaido, Choi Bounge, Ralf Jones
SNK vs. Capcom: SVC Chaos (2003) – Choi Bounge, Ken Masters
Samurai Shodown V (2003) – Kyoshiro Senryo
The King of Fighters 2003 (2003) – Benimaru Nikaido, Ralf Jones
The King of Fighters: Maximum Impact (2004) – Ralf Jones
The King of Fighters Neowave (2005) – Benimaru Nikaido, Choi Bounge, Ralf Jones
NeoGeo Battle Coliseum (2005) – Fuuma, Mudman
The King of Fighters XI (2005) – Benimaru Nikaido, Ralf Jones
The King of Fighters: Maximum Impact 2 (2006) – Ralf Jones
The King of Fighters XII (2009) – Benimaru Nikaido
The King of Fighters XIII (2010) – Benimaru Nikaido
The King of Fighters XIV (2016) – Benimaru Nikaido, Choi Bounge
The King of Fighters All Star (2018) – Benimaru Nikaido, Choi Bounge
Samurai Shodown (2019) – Kyoshiro Senryo
The King of Fighters XV (2022) – Benimaru Nikaido

References

External links 
 Monster Maezuka's personal blog 
 Monster Maezuka at Clutch 
 
 

1962 births
Living people
Japanese male singers
Japanese male video game actors
Japanese male voice actors
Japanese-language singers
People from Osaka Prefecture
Osaka University of Arts alumni
Musicians from Osaka
20th-century Japanese male actors
21st-century Japanese male actors